Fidase Peak is a distinctive peak  east of Mount Jacquinot, rising to  at the west end of Mott Snowfield, Trinity Peninsula. The name represents the initial letters of the Falkland Islands and Dependencies Aerial Survey Expedition (FIDASE) (1955–57) led by P.G. Mott.

References 

Mountains of Trinity Peninsula